Bisporella is a genus of fungi in the family Helotiaceae. , the nomenclatural database Index Fungorum lists 31 species in the genus.

Species

Bisporella aesculi
Bisporella allantospora
Bisporella calycellinoides
Bisporella citrina
Bisporella confluens
Bisporella discedens
Bisporella fuegiana
Bisporella fuscocincta
Bisporella hubeiensis
Bisporella hypostroma
Bisporella iodocyanescens
Bisporella macra
Bisporella magnispora
Bisporella maireana
Bisporella montana
Bisporella nannfeldtii
Bisporella oritis
Bisporella pallescens
Bisporella polygoni
Bisporella pteridicola
Bisporella resinicola
Bisporella rubescens
Bisporella schusteri
Bisporella shangrilana
Bisporella sinica
Bisporella strumosa
Bisporella subpallida
Bisporella sulfurina
Bisporella tetraspora
Bisporella triseptata

References

Helotiales genera
Helotiaceae
Taxa described in 1884
Taxa named by Pier Andrea Saccardo